Illikkal Kallu is a Thalanadu located on top of the Illickal Malaa in the Kottayam district of Kerala, India.The distance from kottayam railway station to illikal kallu is 57km. Situated at around 4000 feet above sea level, Illickal Kallu is a major tourist attraction in Thalanadu.  L. S. G.D., Thalanadu village of Meenachil taluk. Only one half of the original rock remains, as the other half of the rock has fallen off. The nearest town is Teekoy. Numerous mountain streams originate from this peak and flow down to form the Meenachil River. Tourists must trek <1 km to reach the summit of the peak.

Illikkal Mala comprises three hills, each rising up to 4,000 ft above sea level. Each of the hills has a peculiar shape. One of them resembles a mushroom, which is why it is known as Kuda Kallu (umbrella-shaped rock). The second hill has a small hunch on the sides and is therefore referred to as Koonu Kallu (hunch back rock). There is a -foot-wide bridge called Narakapalam (bridge to hell) connecting these two hills. The beauty and the landscape of illikkal kallu is similar to that of the pillar rocks in Kodaikanal. It is said that the mythical medicinal herb Neela Koduveli grows here. This mythical blue flower is also believed to possess supernatural powers, which could increase wealth and ensure a rich harvest.

From the hilltops, the Arabian Sea can be seen on the far horizon as a thin blue stroke. The view of the sunset from above the peak in the evening of a full moon day can be sensational: the moon can be seen rising up like another sun, as the orange sun goes down.

References 

 http://travel.manoramaonline.com/travel/getting-around-kerala/illikkal-kallu-trek-backpack-adventure-mountain-travel.html - Travel review of Illikal Kallu
 https://www.tripadvisor.in/Attraction_Review-g297634-d8059488-Reviews-Illikkal_Kallu-Kottayam_Kerala.html - Trip advisor page of Illikal kallu
 http://www.keralatrips.co.in/2015/06/illickal-kallu-poonjar-kottayam.html 
 https://kochi2ladakh.com/listing/illikkal-kallu-history-trekking-guide-vagamon/ -Travel guide on Illikal Kallu
 https://www.facebook.com/illikkalkalluofficial/ -  Facebook page of illikal kallu

External links 

https://www.facebook.com/illikkalkalluofficial/ - Facebook Page
http://www.illikkalkallu.com/  - the official website of illikal Kallu
 https://enteyathrakal.com/illickal-kallu/ - Illikal Kallu Travelogue
 http://healthacation.com/ - Healthacation official website 

Mountains of Kerala
Geography of Kottayam district
Tourist attractions in Kottayam district